Shoygu is a Tuvan given name and surname. Notable people with the surname include:

 Larisa Shoygu (1953–2021), Russian politician
 Sergei Shoygu (born 1955), Russian politician and military officer
 Yulia Shoygu (born 1977), Russian politician 

All three individuals listed are descendents of Kuzhuget Shoigu (né Shoigu Kuzhuget), whose first name and surname were transposed on official forms due to a clerical error.